Mistral may refer to:
 Mistral (wind) in southern France and Sardinia

Automobiles 
 Maserati Mistral, a Maserati grand tourer produced from 1963 until 1970
 Nissan Mistral, or Terrano II, a Nissan 4×4 produced from 1993 until 2006
 Microplas Mistral, a kit car from the 1950s produced in England, United States, and New Zealand

Companies 

Mistral Group, an American defense and law enforcement product marketing company
Mistral Solutions, an Indian product design and systems engineering company
Mistral Appliances, an Australian home appliances brand

Aviation 
 Mistral Air (now Poste Air Cargo), an Italian cargo airline 
 Mistral Aviation, an airline from the Republic of the Congo
 Mistral Engine Company, a Swiss light aircraft and helicopter engine manufacturer
 Aviasud Mistral, a French ultralight aircraft
 Sud-Est SE 535 Mistral, the French version of the de Havilland Vampire jet fighter
 Swing Mistral, a German paraglider design
 OpenSkies, an airline with the callsign MISTRAL

People and characters 
 Mistral Raymond (born 1987), American football player
 Frédéric Mistral (1830–1914), French writer and lexicographer
 Gabriela Mistral (1889–1957), pseudonym of the Chilean poet Lucila Godoy Alcayaga
 Jacques Mistral (born 1947), French economist and professor
 Jorge Mistral (1920–1972), Spanish actor
 Mistral, title character of the Laurell Hamilton novel Mistral's Kiss
 Mistral, a character from the video game Metal Gear Rising: Revengeance

Ships and watercraft 
 French ship Mistral, various ships of the French Navy, including:
 Mistral-class amphibious assault ship
 Mistral (L9013), the lead ship of the Mistral-class
 Spanish submarine Mistral (S73), an Agosta-class submarine
 Mistral One Design Class, a former windsurf class
 Grand Mistral (previously Mistral), an Iberocruceros cruise ship

Other uses 
 Mistral (missile), a surface-to-air missile developed in France
 Le Mistral (train), an express train which ran between Paris and Nice
 Mistral (album), a 1980 album by Freddie Hubbard
 Mistral (crater), a crater on Mercury
 Mistral (pisco), a brand of pisco named after Gabriela Mistral
 Mistral (typeface), a 1953 casual typeface designed by Frenchman Roger Excoffon
 Operation Mistral 2, a Croatian military offensive in 1995
 Mistral, a brand name of the fungicide fenpropimorph

See also
 Mestral (disambiguation)